William Eric Grasar (18 May 1913 – 28 December 1982) was an English prelate of the Roman Catholic Church. He served as the Bishop of Shrewsbury from 1962 to 1980.

Born in Scunthorpe on 18 May 1913, he was ordained to the priesthood on 18 December 1937. He was appointed the Bishop of Shrewsbury by the Holy See on 26 April 1962. His consecration to the Episcopate took place on 27 June 1962, the principal consecrator was Francis Joseph Grimshaw, Archbishop of Birmingham, and the principal co-consecrators were John Aloysius Murphy, Archbishop of Cardiff, and Edward Ellis, Bishop of Nottingham. He participated in all the four sessions of the Second Vatican Council, held between in 1962 and 1965.

He resigned on 20 March 1980 and assumed the title Bishop emeritus of Shrewsbury. He died on 28 December 1982, aged 69.

References

1913 births
1982 deaths
20th-century Roman Catholic bishops in England
Participants in the Second Vatican Council
People from Scunthorpe
Roman Catholic bishops of Shrewsbury